The British Council for Peace in Vietnam was formed in April 1965 and later became the British Campaign for Peace in Vietnam.  It was also known as the National Vietnam Campaign Committee.

Fenner Brockway was a president.  Amicia Young was a secretary who kept many records and papers of this organisation.

See also

 Vietnam War

External links
Pacifist History
Primary sources for undergraduate modules
Amicia Young (b. 1914)

1965 establishments in the United Kingdom
Anti–Vietnam War groups
Organizations established in 1965
Peace organisations based in the United Kingdom
United Kingdom–Vietnam relations